This is a list of municipalities of South Africa. The largest metropolitan areas are governed by metropolitan municipalities, while the rest of the country is divided into district municipalities, each of which consists of several local municipalities. Since the boundary reform at the time of the municipal election of 3 August 2016 there are 8 metropolitan municipalities, 44 district municipalities and 205 local municipalities.

Metropolitan municipalities

District municipalities 
For comparison purposes the metropolitan municipalities are also included in this list.

Local municipalities 
For comparison purposes the metropolitan municipalities are also included in this list.

Former municipalities
These municipalities have been dissolved since the current system of local government was established in 2000.

By province
The lists linked below also include maps showing the locations of the municipalities.
 List of municipalities in the Eastern Cape
 List of municipalities in the Free State
 List of municipalities in Gauteng
 List of municipalities in KwaZulu-Natal
 List of municipalities in Limpopo
 List of municipalities in Mpumalanga
 List of municipalities in the North West
 List of municipalities in the Northern Cape
 List of municipalities in the Western Cape

References

External links 
 Municipal Demarcation Board

Municipalities of South Africa
Municipalities
 
South Africa